The 2008–09 Wake Forest Demon Deacons men's basketball team represented Wake Forest University in the 2008–09 NCAA Division I men's basketball season. The team's head coach was Dino Gaudio.  he team played its home games in the Lawrence Joel Veterans Memorial Coliseum in Winston-Salem, North Carolina, and was a member of the Atlantic Coast Conference (ACC).

On January 19, the Deacons took the top spot in both the ESPN/USA Today coaches poll and the Associated Press poll, making it the second time in program history a Wake Forest team was number one in the country.

Wake Forest finished the regular season with a record of 24–5, and 11–5 in the ACC, which tied them with Duke. The Demon Deacons received the number two seed in the 2009 ACC men's basketball tournament in a tiebreaker over Duke because of their victory against number one seed North Carolina.

Preseason
In the preseason ESPN/USA Today Coaches Poll the Demon Deacons were ranked #24.

Roster

Schedule

|-
!colspan=12 style=| Regular season

|-
!colspan=12 style=|ACC Tournament 

|-
!colspan=12 style=|NCAA Tournament

Rankings

Leading scorer by game

See also
 2008-09 NCAA Division I men's basketball rankings

References

Wake Forest
Wake Forest Demon Deacons men's basketball seasons
Wake Forest